Pseudoalteromonas mariniglutinosa is a marine bacterium.

External links
Type strain of Pseudoalteromonas mariniglutinosa at BacDive -  the Bacterial Diversity Metadatabase

Alteromonadales